Adams vs. Jackson may refer to one of two United States presidential elections between John Quincy Adams and Andrew Jackson:

 1824 United States presidential election, won by John Quincy Adams against Andrew Jackson, William H. Crawford, and Henry Clay
 1828 United States presidential election, won by Andrew Jackson against John Quincy Adams